The 2023 Houston Christian Huskies football team represents Houston Christian University as a member of the Southland Conference during the 2023 NCAA Division I FCS football season. They are led by first-year head coach Braxton Harris. The Huskies play their home games at Husky Stadium in Houston, Texas.

Schedule
Houston Christian announced their 2023 schedule on December 14, 2022.

References

Houston Christian
Houston Christian Huskies football seasons
Houston Christian Huskies football